The Infernal Storm is the fourth studio album by the American death metal band, Incantation. The album was released in 2000 on Relapse Records (US), Moria Records Brazil and as PLP on Morbid Records.

Track listing

Line up

Mike Saez - Guitar/Vocals
John McEntee - Guitars
Dave Culross - Drums
Rob Yench - Bass

Incantation (band) albums
2000 albums
Relapse Records albums
Albums produced by Steve Evetts